Tresali is one of six parishes (administrative divisions) in Nava, a municipality within the province and autonomous community of Asturias, in northern Spain.

Parishes in Nava